The 6th National Television Awards ceremony was held at the Royal Albert Hall on 10 October 2000 and was hosted by Sir Trevor McDonald.

Awards

References

National Television Awards
National Television Awards
National Television Awards
National Television Awards
National Television Awards
National Television Awards